The Canon de 75 mm modèle 1924 was a French naval anti-aircraft gun designed after World War I.  It served aboard battleships, cruisers and destroyers during World War II.  In Polish service it was known as the   75 mm Armata przeciwlotnicza wz.1922/1924.  In German service it was known as the 7.5 cm Flak M.22-24(f) and was used to arm Germany's Atlantic Wall fortifications.

Naval Service

Ship classes that carried the Canon de 75 mm modèle 1924 include:
Bretagne-class
Chacal-class
Duguay-Trouin-class
Duquesne-class

References

Bibliography

External links 
 French 75 mm/50 (2.95") Model 1922, 1924 and 1927

World War II naval weapons
Naval guns of France
75 mm artillery